Gabriela Markus (born February 20, 1988) is a Brazilian engineer, model and beauty pageant titleholder who was crowned Miss Brasil 2012. She represented Brazil in Miss Universe 2012, finishing as 4th Runner-Up. 
.

Personal life
Markus was born in Teutônia, Taquari Valley, in Rio Grande do Sul state to a German mother and a Portuguese father. She graduated with a degree in food engineering.

Pageantry

Miss Rio Grande do Sul
Markus finished as first runner up in the Miss Rio Grande do Sul 2010, and was crowned Miss Rio Grande do Sul 2012.

Miss Brasil 2012
Markus won the Miss Brasil beauty pageant on September 29, 2012, winning the twelfth title for Rio Grande do Sul and expanding the advantage of the state as the biggest winner in the history of the pageant.

Miss Universe 2012
Markus placed fifth (fourth Runner-Up) behind (Australia) Renae Ayris, (Venezuela) Irene Esser, (Philippines) Janine Tugonon and the winner (USA) Olivia Culpo in the Miss Universe 2012 pageant on December 19, 2012. In addition, she also placed fifth in the national costume competition.

References

External links
Official Miss Brasil website

Living people
1988 births
People from Rio Grande do Sul
Miss Brazil winners
Brazilian beauty pageant winners
Brazilian people of German descent
Brazilian people of Portuguese descent
Miss Universe 2012 contestants
Brazilian female models
Brazilian models of German descent